Top Model Sverige was a Swedish reality television show based on America's Next Top Model. It was broadcast on TV3 in Sweden. The first season, Top Model Stockholm (abbreviated as Sthlm), aired in 2007 and was hosted by Vendela Kirsebom. The show returned to TV3 in 2012 with Izabella Scorupco as host. However, she also lasted for one season only and was replaced by Caroline Winberg who hosted the show's third and fourth seasons.

Show format
During the second season the show also saw a unique twist when the entire judging, held in Los Angeles, was done in English due to some members of the panel regulars were not able to speak Swedish.

Season 4 featured both female and male participants, and the cast number rose to 14 from 10. In addition, the season broadcast 40 episodes over 10 weeks.

Cycles

See also
 Top Model (Scandinavia)

External links
The Official Top Model STHLM website

References

 

TV3 (Sweden) original programming
Sweden's Next Top Supermodel
Swedish reality television series
2007 Swedish television series debuts
Swedish television series based on American television series